Diana Enache and Daniëlle Harmsen were the defending champions, but lost in the quarterfinals to Paula Kania and Irina Khromacheva, 4–6, 5–7.

Renata Voráčová and Lenka Wienerová won the title, defeating Paula Kania and Irina Khromacheva in the final, 2–6, 6–3, [10–6].

Seeds

Draw

Draw

References
 Main Draw

Trofeul Popeci - Doubles
Trofeul Popeci